Sustainable Waterloo Region is a non-profit organization headquartered in Waterloo, Ontario, Canada with a mission to foster collaborations that enable local organizations to convert their sustainability interest into action.

History
Sustainable Waterloo Region, formerly Sustainable Waterloo, was founded by Mike Morrice and Chris DePaul in 2008 as part of a business project at Wilfrid Laurier University's School of Business and Economics. Their research focused on the business implications of imminent carbon pricing mechanisms and the viability of establishing a non-profit in Waterloo Region that would help organizations achieve carbon reductions through collaborations and education.

Inspiration was found in the business model and success of Sustainable Silicon Valley and CivicAction (formerly the Toronto City Summit Alliance). In July 2008, Sustainable Waterloo incorporated as a not-for-profit with a "vision for an environmentally and economically resilient community that believes economic growth should not come at the expense of green and sustainable practices".

Sustainable Waterloo Region hosted its first Educational Forum in January 2009 with over 200 people in attendance, confirming community-wide interest in GHG reductions and support of the organization.

Sustainable Waterloo Region received seed funding from various local businesses, academic institutions, government, and education institutions. Sustainable Waterloo's Founding Partners include Wilfrid Laurier University's CMA Centre for Business Sustainability, Virtual Causeway, Manulife Financial, Waterloo North Hydro Inc, the City of Kitchener, and Ernst & Young.

Name change 

In September 2011, Sustainable Waterloo underwent a significant change, updating its name, brand and office space. At the start of the annual event season Sustainable Waterloo launched its new name: Sustainable Waterloo Region. This name was chosen to better reflect the regional element of the organization's mission and the geographical diversity of Regional Carbon Initiative members. To accompany the name change, the organization shed their previous “squiggle” in exchange for a logo that better communicated inclusivity and holistic sustainability.

At the same time, Sustainable Waterloo Region's office moved from its Uptown Waterloo location to the downtown Kitchener Tannery District.

New logo 

With this name change also came an update to the organization's logo. The Sustainable Waterloo Region logo uses the same font as the organization's original logo to demonstrate ties to its roots. The blue and green cyclical arrow represents the organization's holistic view of sustainability, which goes beyond greenhouse gas reductions. The emphasis on “able” reflects optimism for what Waterloo Region can achieve.

The Regional Carbon Initiative
Sustainable Waterloo's initial project is referred to as The Regional Carbon Initiative, which facilitates voluntary carbon emission reduction targets by providing participating organizations with an online tool to measure their carbon emissions, educational forums and technical workshops, used to learn from their peers about how to reduce emissions. They also aim as much public recognition as possible for those companies that are successful in reducing emissions. The Regional Carbon Initiative launched on June 16, 2009 with the announcement of its first three Pledging Partners, Veriform Inc., Athena Software and Enermodal Engineering, who have voluntarily committed to a carbon reduction target under Sustainable Waterloo's framework. Sustainable Waterloo also released the Guide to the Regional Carbon Initiative, which is a document that details the official reduction framework, the reporting procedure, and the GHG accounting methodology that will be used for all Pledging Partners.

Membership in the Regional Carbon Initiative
Interested parties have two membership options for the Regional Carbon Initiative.

A Pledging Partner reports and works towards carbon emission reductions through the use of services provided. Sustainable Waterloo also publicly communicates the Pledging Partner's reduction targets.

An Observing Organization is provided with the same service offerings as a Pledging Partner, and either uses alternative programs to track and report their carbon emissions or works towards participation in the future.

A Sustaining Partner is a Pledging Partner that has generously committed to a higher annual financial investment in Sustainable Waterloo. Their added support strengthens Sustainable Waterloo's capacity to achieve its mission.

Current members

Sustaining partners

Pledging partners

Observing organizations

References

Environmental organizations based in Ontario
Waterloo, Ontario